The men's normal hill K90 individual competition at the 2003 Asian Winter Games in Aomori, Japan was held on 4 February at the Takinosawa Ski Jumping Hill.

Schedule
All times are Japan Standard Time (UTC+09:00)

Results
Legend
DNS — Did not start

References 

Results at FIS website

External links
Schedule

Individual